Line 16 (Violet) is a future project of the São Paulo Metro.

It will connect with Lines 1-Blue, 2-Green, 4-Yellow, 10-Turquoise, 14-Onyx and 15-Silver.

Stations

References

São Paulo Metro

pt:Metrô de São Paulo#Linhas em obras